Bisbee was an unincorporated community in Tarrant County, located in the U.S. state of Texas. It is now largely part of the cities of Arlington and Mansfield.

References

Unincorporated communities in Tarrant County, Texas
Unincorporated communities in Texas